The Public Defender is a 1931 American pre-Code crime film directed by J. Walter Ruben, starring Richard Dix and featuring Boris Karloff. Rich playboy Pike Winslow dons the mantle of 'The Reckoner', a mysterious avenger, when he learns that his lady friend Barbara Gerry's father has been framed in a bank embezzlement scandal. Using meticulous planning and split-second timing, Pike, along with his associates, the erudite 'Professor' and tough-guy scrapper 'Doc', attempt to find proof that will clear Gerry and identify the real culprits.

Cast
 Richard Dix as Pike Winslow
 Shirley Grey as Barbara Gerry
 Purnell Pratt as John Kirk
 Ruth Weston as Rose Harmer
 Edmund Breese as Frank Wells
 Frank Sheridan as Charles Harmer
 Alan Roscoe as Inspector Malcolm O'Neil
 Boris Karloff as 'Professor'
 Nella Walker as Aunt Matilda
 Paul Hurst as 'Doc'
 Carl Gerard as Cyrus Pringle
 Robert Emmett O'Connor as Detective Brady
 Phillips Smalley as Thomas Drake (as Phillip Smalley)

See also
 Boris Karloff filmography

References

External links

1931 films
1931 crime films
American crime films
1930s English-language films
American black-and-white films
Films directed by J. Walter Ruben
RKO Pictures films
1930s American films